Marion is a town in Plymouth County, Massachusetts, United States. The population was 5,347 at the 2020 census.

For geographic and demographic information on the village of Marion Center, please see the article Marion Center, Massachusetts.

History
Marion was first settled in 1679 as "Sippican", a district of Rochester, Massachusetts.  The name, which also lends itself to the river which passes through the north of town and the harbor at the heart of town, was the Wampanoag name for the local tribe.  The town was mostly known for its many local sea captains and sailors whose homes were in town, although there were also some small shipbuilding operations on the harbor as well.  By the late 1840s, however, tensions between the village of Mattapoisett and the town led to a battle which sought to redraw the town lines and effectively take over Sippican Village.  This caused the villagers to form a committee, which went to Boston to petition for incorporation as its own town.  Thus, with the help of a powerful local ally, the town was incorporated on May 14, 1852, and renamed Marion in honor of Revolutionary War hero Francis Marion. Mattapoisett was incorporated in 1857.

Since that time, Marion's economy has mostly relied on the waters of Buzzards Bay, both for fishing and for the summer tourism industry. Recreational sailing is a major seasonal activity for residents and visitors.

Geography

The town is bordered by Mattapoisett to the southwest, Rochester to the northwest, and Wareham to the north and northeast.

Marion is located on Buzzards Bay, and its geography is shaped by the water. Much of the town is separated into two halves by Sippican Harbor, with Converse Point to the west and Sippican Neck to the east. To the west of Converse Point is Aucoot Cove, where Aucoot Creek and Borden's Brook empty into the bay. Sprague's Cove, Hammetts Cove (which is directly east of Little Neck), Blankenship Cove and Planting Island Cove are all coves off of Sippican Harbor. To the east of Sippican Neck is Wings Cove, which separates the neck from Great Hill Point. Along the northeastern border of town is the Weweantic River, which separates the town from Wareham. The Sippican River is also a tributary to this river, and further divides the town from Wareham. Between Sippican Harbor and the Weweantic River lies the Great Swamp. To the North of Marion lies Rochester, Massachusetts. Marion has several parks, as well as wharves, beaches, The Beverly Yacht Club, Little Marion G.C. (public), and The Kittansett Club G.C. (private). Marion is a typical old New England town that has a small quaint village with many traditional Cape Cod style homes. The village includes The Marion General Store that dates back to the 1800s.

Demographics

As of the census of 2000, there were 5,123 people, 1,996 households, and 1,441 families residing in the town. The racial makeup of the town was 92.17% White, 1.58% African American, 0.10% Native American, 0.35% Asian, 0.08% Pacific Islander, 3.46% from other races, and 2.26% from two or more races. Hispanic or Latino of any race were 0.55% of the population.

There were 1,996 households, out of which 31.7% had children under the age of 18 living with them, 61.4% were married couples living together, 8.4% had a female householder with no husband present, and 27.8% were non-families. 24.1% of all households were made up of individuals, and 11.9% had someone living alone who was 65 years of age or older.  The average household size was 2.51 and the average family size was 3.00.

In the town, the population was spread out, with 25.1% under the age of 18, 4.2% from 18 to 24, 24.7% from 25 to 44, 28.3% from 45 to 64, and 17.7% who were 65 years of age or older.  The median age was 42 years. For every 100 females, there were 92.4 males.  For every 100 females age 18 and over, there were 87.8 males.

The median income for a household in the town was $71,250, and the median income for a family was $104,265. Males had a median income of $46,711 versus $35,911 for females. The per capita income for the town was $47,265.  About 3.5% of families and 4.6% of the population were below the poverty line, including 7.0% of those under age 18 and 2.0% of those age 65 or over.

Government
Marion is represented in the Massachusetts House of Representatives as a part of the Tenth Bristol district, which also includes Fairhaven, Mattapoisett, Rochester and a portion of Middleborough.  The town is represented in the Massachusetts Senate as a part of the First Plymouth and Bristol district, which also includes Berkley, Bridgewater, Carver, Dighton,  Middleborough, Raynham, Taunton, and Wareham.  The town is patrolled by the Marion Police Department.

On the national level, Marion is a part of Massachusetts's 9th congressional district, and is currently represented by William R. Keating.  The state's senior member of the United States Senate is Elizabeth Warren. The junior senator is Ed Markey.

Marion uses the open town meeting form of government, which is led by a board of selectmen.  The town's police, as well as the post office, are all located in the town's central village. The village is also the site of the Elizabeth Taber Library, which is a member of the SAILS Library Network. The Fire/EMS Department is almost completely on-call with only (2) full-time or career members. Fire stations are located at Station No. 1 in the central village on Spring Street and Station No. 2 in East Marion at the corner of Point and Creek Rd. near the Great Swamp.

Education

Marion is a member of the 2,700-student Old Rochester Regional School District.  The town, along with Mattapoisett and Rochester, operate as a single school system with each town having its own school subcommittee.  Marion operates the Sippican School for students from pre-kindergarten to grade 6.  Seventh- and eighth-grade students attend Old Rochester Regional Junior High School, and high school students attend Old Rochester Regional High School.  Both regional schools are located on Route 6 in Mattapoisett, just over the Marion town line.  The high school competes in the South Coast Conference for athletics.  Their mascot is the bulldog, and their colors are red, black, and white.  The town's Thanksgiving Day football rival is Apponequet Regional High School, in Lakeville.  Marion students may also choose to attend Upper Cape Cod Regional Technical School, a technical high school located in Bourne on the Cape side of the canal.

The town is the site of Tabor Academy, a private academy serving grades 9–12.

Infrastructure
As a small New England town the major infrastructures are the roads, water,  and the waste disposal.  Marion also has a fine harbor facility with a wide concrete vehicle accessible jetty. Boats can tie up on three sides to load and unload from vehicles right on the jetty.  A wooden ramp runs from the jetty to the Harbormaster lookout.  There is a large adjoining unpaved parking lot.

Marion is home to one of the largest sailing fleets in Massachusetts showing a forest of masts in the inner harbor.  Directly adjacent to the Harbormaster is a small shellfish area which is stocked by the town.

There is a public beach at the end of Front St.  It is groomed and has a lifeguard station.  It also has a large parking lot.

The town Library (Elizabeth Taber Library) is on the ground floor of a colonial building next to the Town offices on Spring St.

Transportation
Interstate 195 passes through the town, and has an exit at Massachusetts Route 105. Route 105's southern terminus is at its intersection with U.S. Route 6, which also passes through the town.

The nearest regional bus and air service can be reached in New Bedford. The nearest national air service can be reached at T. F. Green Airport in Rhode Island, and the nearest international airport is Logan International Airport in Boston. There are no railroad services in town; the nearest rail service can be reached in Middleborough, at the terminus to the Middleborough-Lakeville line of the MBTA's commuter rail service. The nearest freight rail service is in Wareham.

Military Industry 
Until 2022, Marion was home to Lockheed Martin Sippican, which developed technology for undersea warfare (e.g. drones, torpedoes, antennae). The company was founded in 1940 as Francis Associates, went public as Sippican Ocean Systems, Inc. in 1981, and was acquired by Lockheed Martin in 2004.

Notable people

 Benjamin Briggs, Master of the Mary Celeste
 Richard E. Byrd, Rear Admiral; first man to fly over both the North and South Poles, summer resident
 Grover Cleveland, President of the United States; summer resident
 Dom DiMaggio, Red Sox centerfielder
 Charles Dana Gibson, artist, creator of the "Gibson Girl" look
 Greg F. Gifune, Novelist, Editor, Film Producer, former resident, grew up in Marion
 Andrew A. Harwood, Rear Admiral; career naval officer
 Henry James, novelist
 Lucy Myers Wright Mitchell, first female classical archaeologist
 Frances Folsom Cleveland Preston, former first lady to United States President Grover Cleveland, summer resident
 Geraldo Rivera, summer resident
 Franklin Delano Roosevelt, President of the United states; summer resident
 Carl Ruggles, American composer, born in Marion
 Augustus Saint-Gaudens, sculptor, summer resident
 James Spader, summer resident

References

External links

 Town of Marion official website
 Elizabeth Taber Library (public library)
 Marion Gym- workout facility (athletic facility at town building)
 SouthCoastToday.com: Marion
 The Marconi radio transmitter station in Marion
 Live area Police & Fire Scanner Radio
 City-Data.com
 SOCO magazine

 
Populated coastal places in Massachusetts
Towns in Plymouth County, Massachusetts
Populated places established in 1679
1679 establishments in Massachusetts
Towns in Massachusetts